Saša Kovačević (born 29 March 1973) is a Serbian former professional footballer who played as a striker.

Club career
After playing for Radnički Beograd, Kovačević moved to Obilić in 1996. He was a regular member of the team that won the 1997–98 First League of FR Yugoslavia. In August 2000, Kovačević was transferred to Turkish side Erzurumspor, alongside his teammate Milorad Korać, but left the club in May 2001.

International career
Kovačević made his international debut for FR Yugoslavia on 23 December 1998, coming on as a second-half substitute for Dejan Savićević in a 2–0 away friendly loss against Israel.

Honours
Obilić
 First League of FR Yugoslavia: 1997–98
 FR Yugoslavia Cup: Runner-up 1997–98

References

External links
 
 
 
 
 

Association football forwards
Azerbaijan Premier League players
Expatriate footballers in Azerbaijan
Expatriate footballers in Turkey
First League of Serbia and Montenegro players
FK Hajduk Beograd players
FK Kolubara players
FK Obilić players
FK Radnički Beograd players
FK Železnik players
Footballers from Belgrade
Serbia and Montenegro expatriate footballers
Serbia and Montenegro expatriate sportspeople in Azerbaijan
Serbia and Montenegro expatriate sportspeople in Turkey
Serbia and Montenegro footballers
Serbia and Montenegro international footballers
Serbian footballers
1973 births
Living people